The 2004 Subway 500 was a NASCAR Nextel Cup Series stock car race held on October 24, 2004 at Martinsville Speedway in Martinsville, Virginia. Contested over 500 laps, the race was the 32nd of the 36-race 2004 NASCAR Nextel Cup Series season, and the sixth race in the 2004 Chase for the Nextel Cup.

Pole position was won by Penske-Jasper Racing's Ryan Newman, while Jimmie Johnson of Hendrick Motorsports won the race. Chip Ganassi Racing's Jamie McMurray and Newman finished second and third, respectively.

Background
Martinsville Speedway, considered the "Paperclip" for its paper clip shape, is the shortest track on the Cup circuit at only 0 long. The track's banking is 12 degrees, while the straightaways were flat.

Entering the race, Kurt Busch led the points standings with 5850 points. Dale Earnhardt Jr. (5826), Jeff Gordon (5776), Elliott Sadler (5693), and Mark Martin (5664) comprised the top five, while Tony Stewart (5646), Matt Kenseth (5635), Jimmie Johnson (5623), Ryan Newman (5579), and Jeremy Mayfield (5501) rounded out the Chase field.

Hendrick Motorsports plane crash

Before the race, a Beechcraft Super King Air carrying ten people, seven of whom were Hendrick Motorsports personnel, including John Hendrick, Rick Hendrick's brother, and his two daughters Kimberly and Jennifer; Ricky Hendrick, Rick's son and former driver; Jeff Turner, Hendrick Motorsports' general manager; Randy Dorton, Hendrick's Director of Engine Operations; Joe Jackson, an executive for Jeff Gordon's sponsor DuPont; along with Scott Lathram, a pilot for Tony Stewart, and pilots Richard Tracy and Elizabeth Morrison, crashed into nearby Bull Mountain, killing all on board. The crash occurred 27 minutes before the race began.

Qualifying
51 cars entered the race, ten of whom had attempted less than 20 races in 2004: Ryan McGlynn (#00), Greg Sacks (#13), Kevin Lepage (#37), Carl Long (#46), Tony Raines (#51), Klaus Graf (#59), Mike Garvey (#75), Mario Gosselin (#80), Brad Teague (#94), and Chad Chaffin (#98). Travis Kvapil (#06) was later added to the list, while Raines was removed.

Qualifying was held on October 22, and was postponed by 30 minutes due to rain.

The top 17 drivers broke the previous record. Jimmy Spencer, Todd Bodine, Kirk Shelmerdine, Gosselin, and Lepage were forced to use provisionals. Graf, Garvey, Morgan Shepherd, McGlynn, Sacks, and Teague failed to qualify. Long withdrew from qualifying and did not set a time. Lepage and Shelmerdine were forced to move to the rear of the field for engine changes.

Full qualifying results 
1. Ryan Newman #12 ALLTEL Dodge Penske Racing 97.043mph

2. Rusty Wallace #2 Miller Lite Dodge Penske Racing 96.234mph

3. Dale Earnhardt Jr. #8 Budweiser Chevrolet Dale Earnhardt Incorporated 96.205mph

4. Ward Burton # 0 Netzero HiSpeed Chevrolet Haas CNC Racing 96.107mph

5. Travis Kvapil #06 Mobil 1/Jasper Engines Dodge Penske Racing 96.102mph

6. Scott Riggs * #10 Valvoline Chevrolet MBV Motorsports 96.063mph

7. Kurt Busch #97 Sharpie/IRWIN Ford Roush Racing 96.039mph

8. Jamie McMurray #42 Texaco Havoline Dodge Chip Ganassi Racing 96.039mph

9. Ricky Rudd #21 Motorcraft/US Air Force Ford Wood Brothers Racing 95.772mph

10. Jeff Green #43 Cheerios/Betty Crocker Dodge Petty Enterprises 95.743mph

11. Jeremy Mayfield #19 Dodge Dealers/UAW Dodge Evernham Motorsports 95.738mph

12. Jeff Burton # 30 America Online Chevrolet Richard Childress Racing 95.670mph

13. Tony Stewart #20 Home Depot Chevrolet Joe Gibbs Racing95.665mph

14. Brendan Gaughan * #77 Kodak/Jasper Engines Dodge Penske/Jasper Racing 95.656mph

15. Jeff Gordon #24 Dupont Chevrolet Hendrick Motorsports 95.651mph

16. Sterling Marlin #40 Coors Light Dodge Chip Ganassi Racing 95.622mph

17. Bobby Labonte #18 Interstate Batteries Chevrolet Joe Gibbs Racing 95.549mph

18. Jimmie Johnson #48 Lowe's Chevrolet Hendrick Motorsports 95.304mph

19. Kevin Harvick #29 GM Goodwrench Chevrolet Richard Childress Racing 95.218mph

20. Ken Schrader #49 Schwan's Home Service Dodge BAM Racing 95.127mph

21. Greg Biffle #16 National Guard/Subway Ford Roush Racing 95.098mph

22. Carl Edwards #99 Roush Racing Ford Roush Racing 94.912mph

23. Mark Martin # 6 Viagra Ford Roush Racing 94.799mph

24. Scott Wimmer * #22 Caterpillar Dodge Bill Davis Racing 94.784mph

25. Matt Kenseth #17 DeWalt Ford Roush Racing 94.770mph

26. Kyle Petty #45 Georgia Pacific/Brawny Dodge Petty Enterprises 94.756mph

27. Terry Labonte #5 Kellogg's Chevrolet Hendrick Motorsports 94.746mph

28. Casey Mears #41 Target/Breast Cancer Research Foundation Dodge Chip Ganassi Racing 94.732mph

29. Joe Nemechek #01 US Army Chevrolet MB2 Motorsports 94.689mph

30. Michael Waltrip #15 NAPA Auto Parts Chevrolet Dale Earnhardt Incorporated 94.618mph

31. Hermie Sadler #02 SCORE Motorsports Chevrolet Angela Sadler 94.604mph

32. Dale Jarrett #88 UPS Ford Robert Yates Racing 94.534mph

33. Elliott Sadler #38 M&M's Ford Robert Yates Racing 94.444mph

34. Brian Vickers * #25 GMAC Financial Services Chevrolet Hendrick Motorsports 94.289mph

35. Bobby Hamilton Jr #32 Tide Chevrolet PPI Motorsports 94.040mph

36. Robby Gordon #31 Cingular Wireless Chevrolet Richard Childress Racing 93.975mph

37. Chad Chaffin #98 Mach One Inc Ford William Edwards 93.956mph

38. Kasey Kahne *#9 Dodge Dealers/UAW Dodge Evernham Motorsports 93.761mph

39. Jimmy Spencer #4 Lucas Oil Products Chevrolet Morgan-McClure Racing 92.124mph (provisional)

40. Todd Bodine #50 Arnold Development Companies Dodge Arnold Racing 92.769mph (provisional)

41. Kirk Shelmerdine #72 Vote for Bush Ford Kirk Shelmerdine 87.968mph (provisional)

42. Morgan Shepherd #89 Racing With Jesus/Red Line Oil Dodge Cindy Shepherd 92.159mph (provisional)

43. Kevin Lepage #37 Carter's Royal Dispos-all Dodge John Carter 92.556mph (provisional)

Did not qualify

44. Klaus Graf #59 BAM Racing Dodge BAM Racing 93.687mph

45. Mike Garvey #75 Jani-King Dodge Randall Haefelle 93.474mph

46. Mario Gosselin # Hover Motorsports Ford Hover Motorsports 92.710mph

47. Ryan McGlynn #00 Buyers Choice Auto Warranties Chevrolet Raynard McGlynn 91.624mph

48. Greg Sacks #13 ARC Dehooker/Vita Coco Dodge James Wilsberg 91.416mph

49. Brad Teague #94 WW Motorsports Ford David Watson 90.503mph

50. Carl Long #46 RacingMetal.com Dodge Glenn Motorsport no time

Race
Ryan Newman led the first nine laps of the race, with Rusty Wallace claiming the lead on lap 10, leading for 33 laps. Terry Labonte then led the next eight laps, with Kasey Kahne leading for 17 laps before Labonte took the lead back. Tony Stewart took the lead on lap 90, losing it on lap 108 to Kurt Busch, who led for only the lap before Sterling Marlin took over, leading until Busch reclaimed it on lap 131. Busch would lead for 54 laps, with Matt Kenseth briefly leading for a lap before Busch led the longest streak with 64 laps. Kevin Harvick, Wallace, and Kenseth would split the lead for the next 45 laps, Harvick leading 43 of them, followed by leading another 61 after taking the lead back from Kenseth on lap 295. After Busch led lap 356, Jamie McMurray took the lead, leading for 20 laps until Jeff Gordon led for six laps from lap 377 to 382 before McMurray reclaimed it. Jimmie Johnson then led his first laps of the race on lap 405, relinquishing it on lap 410. McMurray (1) and Marlin (29) led the next 30 laps until Johnson took the lead on lap 440, leading for the remainder of the race. McMurray, Newman, Marlin, and Busch finished in the top five, while the top ten consisted of Jeremy Mayfield, Jeff Green, Harvick, Jeff Gordon, and Rusty Wallace.

17 cautions occurred during the race. The first was on lap 4, when Joe Nemechek and Todd Bodine crashed in turn 2. On lap 14, Brendan Gaughan, Marlin, and Mayfield were involved in an accident in turn 4, with Jimmy Spencer becoming the beneficiary and gain back a lap. On lap 21, Rudd spun out in turn 2, allowing Shelmerdine to gain back a spot. On lap 66, Robby Gordon crashed in turn 4, allowing Mario Gosselin to be the beneficiary. On lap 77, Rudd and Robby Gordon crashed in turn 4, Shelmerdine gaining another lap back. On lap 107, Dale Jarrett, Casey Mears, Bobby Hamilton Jr., and Kirk Shelmerdine crashed in turn 3, allowing Robby Gordon to regain a lap. On lap 184, Kyle Petty spun in turn 2, permitting Nemechek to gain back a lap. On lap 292, Carl Edwards spun in turn 2, with Jeff Gordon being the beneficiary. The first caution for debris was flown on lap 322, with Robby Gordon becoming the beneficiary. Bobby Labonte, Jeff Green, and Ken Schrader crashed in turn 4 on lap 355, Rudd winning a lap back. Ward Burton spun in turn 2 on lap 372, though there was no beneficiary. On lap 410, Jarrett spun out in turn 3, with Petty gaining a lap back. The second debris caution flew on lap 418, Travis Kvapil being the beneficiary. On lap 451, Elliott Sadler spun out in turn 4, Burton gaining back a lap. Dale Earnhardt Jr. and Petty crashed in turn 2 on lap 468, with Sadler getting a lap back. However, on lap 477, Sadler would be involved in a crash in turn 2 with Nemechek, allowing Scott Riggs to gain back a lap. The final caution occurred on lap 490, with Edwards and Robby Gordon crashing in turn 3, with Kvapil being the beneficiary again.

Due to the Hendrick Motorsports plane crash, victory lane celebrations were not held, and the grandfather clock often given to the race winner was delivered after the season ended.

Results

Standings after the race

Source:

References

Subway 500
Subway 500
NASCAR races at Martinsville Speedway